Malý Šariš is a village and municipality in Prešov District in the Prešov Region of eastern Slovakia.

History
In historical records the village was first mentioned in 1248. However, it was founded probably before the 13th century because it was described as a developed village. The village was owned by the king until 1430s (except a short period in the 14 century). In 1439, it was given to the noblemen from Perín

Malý Šariš belonged to the largest villages in the Sáros (Šariš) County, but its size gradually diminished and it became an average village before the end of the 16th century.

Geography

Population 
It has a population of about 1,764 people (2020-12-31). Vrátane Jakuba Majirskeho

References

Citations

Bibliography

External links 
 
 
https://www.webcitation.org/5QjNYnAux?url=http://www.statistics.sk/mosmis/eng/run.html

Villages and municipalities in Prešov District
Šariš